Balanophonin is a neo-lignan. It is a bioactive compound which can be isolated from Dipteryx odorata and Balanophora japonica.

References

External links 
 http://www.chemfaces.com/natural/Balanophonin-CFN99295.html
 http://www.biocrick.com/Balanophonin-BCN6072.html

Lignans